The Hunanese people or Xiang-speaking Chinese (Xiang Chinese: 湘語人 Shiōn'nỳ nin) are a Xiang-speaking Han Chinese ethnic subgroup originating from Hunan province in Southern China, but Xiang-speaking people are also found in the adjacent provinces of Guangxi and Guizhou.

Culture

Language
Xiang is a subdivision of spoken Chinese that originates from Hunan. According to Yang Xiong's Fangyan, people in what is the Xiang River region spoke the Southern Chu language, which is considered to be the ancestor of Xiang Chinese today.

Cuisine
Hunan cuisine is very famous of its use of chili peppers and has a history of cooking skills employed in it dating back to the 17th century.

Mao Zedong once told Otto Braun: “The food of the true revolutionary is the red pepper, and he who cannot endure red peppers is also unable to fight.”

Opera 
Huaguxi is a local form of Chinese opera that is very popular in Hunan province.

History

Ancient history
Prehistorically, the main inhabitants were the ancient country of Ba, Nanman, Baiyue and other tribes whose languages cannot be studied. During the Warring States period, large numbers of Chu migrated into Hunan. Their language blended with that of the original natives to produce a new dialect Nanchu (Southern Chu). During Qin and Han dynasty, most part of today's Eastern Hunan belonged to Changsha-Xian/Changsha-Guo. According to Yang Xiong's Fangyan, people in this region spoke Southern Chu, which is considered the ancestor of Xiang Chinese today.

19th and 20th centuries
Hunanese people are associated with political revolutions in 19th and 20th centuries China. The Xiang Army, commanded Zeng Guofan, was instrumental in defeating the Taiping Rebellion. Hunan-born Huang Xing was the leader of the Wuchang Uprising, the first successful uprising against the Qing dynasty and the first army commander-in-chief of the Republic of China. In the 1920s, locals inspired by Wang Fuzhi, a seventeenth-century scholar who had advocated for "Western" ideas of progress, humanism, and nationalism, created the Hunanese self-government movement, which was championed by Peng Huang and the young Mao Zedong. Three of the "Big Five" original Politburo Standing Committee of the Chinese Communist Party members were from Hunan.

Notable people
This is a list of people with either full or partial Hunanese ancestry.
Cai Lun
Zhou Dunyi
Wang Fuzhi - Ming loyalist and philosopher.
Zeng Guofan - leader of the Xiang Army who crushed the Taiping Rebellion.
Zuo Zongtang
Qi Baishi - regarded as one of the best Chinese painters in Chinese style.
Huang Xing - leader of the Wuchang Uprising and the first army commander-in-chief of the Republic of China
Chen Tianhua - Han nationalist.
He Long
Mao Zedong - founder and first Paramount leader of the People's Republic of China.
Liu Shaoqi - second President of the People's Republic of China.
Peng Dehuai - considered one of the most successful and highly respected generals in the early Chinese Communist Party.
Hu Yaobang
Zhu Rongji
James Soong - founder and current chairman of the People First Party.
Peng Shuai
Qiong Yao - regarded as the best romance novelist in the 20th century 
Liu Wen - model
Song Jiaoren, anti-Qing Revolutionary
Lung Ying-tai
Ma Ying-jeou
Loretta Yang

References

 History of Hunanese (link)

Subgroups of the Han Chinese
People from Hunan